Leila's Hair Museum was a museum in Independence, Missouri that displays examples of hair art dating back to the 17th century.

Hair art
Hair art was a form of art that began in the 16th century or earlier, and flourished in the Victorian era. It was used by people wanting to keep a memento of a loved one before the invention of photography. According to a Minnesota history magazine, hair art originated in England and France and then made its way to the United States. This form of art consisted of necklaces, bracelets, rings, lockets, paintings and medallions embellished with strands of hair.

Founder
Leila Cohoon is a retired cosmetology teacher living in Independence, Missouri. She was a friend of Ronald Reagan and Oliver North and is a member of the Missouri Board of Cosmetology. Leila owns her own school called the Independence College of Cosmetology. She started collecting hair in 1956 and considers it to be her life work. She was always fascinated with hair as a child and believes it is one of the most unusual parts of the human body. She opened the hair museum in 1986 in a small front room in her cosmetology school. She did this because she was running out of space for the collection of hair art that she had built up over the years. Later, she moved her hair museum a few blocks from the old location so as to be able to expand. The new location for the museum consists of several rooms with their walls covered with the hair art from top to bottom .

The collection
Leila’s museum has 600+ wreaths and over 2,000 pieces of jewelry which includes locks of hair dating from the 19th century and earlier. Her oldest exhibit is a brooch dated 1680. Many framed items are over a hundred years old. These include one which is an assemblage of hair from every member of a chapter of the League of Women Voters, and two made of hair shorn from sisters that both entered a convent. There are also exhibits that include the hair of famous people. Elvis Presley is represented; Michael Jackson is present as well, and the museum appeared in a Jeopardy question on December 30, 2016, reflecting this. There is also hair from George Washington, Abraham Lincoln, Daniel Webster, Aaron Burr, singer Jenny Lind and Queen Victoria. Leila is not as interested in collecting the hair of famous people as she is in preserving hair art.

References

External links
 Leila's Hair Museum website
 MikeRowe.com
 Mike Rowe's Somebody's Got To Do It from CNN, episode 1. https://www.youtube.com/watch?v=1qQp2Ff3cKk

Museums in Jackson County, Missouri
History museums in Missouri
Art museums established in 1989
Buildings and structures in Independence, Missouri
Fashion museums in the United States
1989 establishments in Missouri